Botiller v. Dominguez, 130 U.S. 238 (1889), was a decision by the United States Supreme Court dealing with the validity of Spanish or Mexican land grants in the Mexican Cession, the region of the present day southwestern United States that was ceded to the U.S. by Mexico in 1848 under the Treaty of Guadalupe Hidalgo.

The action was in the nature of ejectment, brought in the Superior Court of the Los Angeles County by Dominga Dominguez against Brigido Botiller and others, to recover possession of a tract of land situated in said county, known as 'Rancho Las Virgenes'. The title of the plaintiff was a grant claimed to have been made by the government of Mexico to Nemecio Dominguez and Domingo Carrillo, on October 1, 1834, but no claim under this grant had ever been presented for confirmation to the board of land commissioners, appointed under the California Land Act of 1851 (9 St. 631,) 'to ascertain and settle the private land claims in the state of California,' and no patent had ever issued from the United States to any one for the land, or for any part of it.

The Court held that no title to land in California dependent upon Spanish or Mexican land grants can be of any validity unless presented to and confirmed by the board of land commissioners within the time prescribed by the United States Congress.

See also
List of United States Supreme Court cases, volume 130
Alta California
Treaty of Guadalupe Hidalgo
Aboriginal title in California

Further reading

External links

 

United States Supreme Court cases
United States Supreme Court cases of the Fuller Court
United States land use case law
Mexican-American history
1889 in United States case law
Ranchos of Los Angeles County, California
Mexico–United States relations